Cho Deok-Jin (born February 20, 1983) is a Korean amateur boxer who qualified for the 2008 Olympics at light heavyweight after he was reallocated a place.

External links
Qualifier
sports-reference

1983 births
Living people
Light-heavyweight boxers
Boxers at the 2008 Summer Olympics
Olympic boxers of South Korea
Boxers at the 2006 Asian Games
Boxers at the 2010 Asian Games
South Korean male boxers
Asian Games competitors for South Korea